Universal Music Group is the largest music corporation in the world.

Universal Records may also refer to:

 Universal Records (1995), a record label owned by Universal Music Group
 List of Universal Music Group labels
 Show Dog-Universal Music, an American independent record label
 Universal Records (Philippines), a Filipino record label 
 Universal Classics Records
 Universal Motown Records
 Universal Warning Records, a record label and video production company in Philadelphia
 Universal Records (1988), a country music label owned by Jimmy Bowen and merged into Capitol Records

See also
Universal Audio, previously Universal Recordings, a designer of music software